Isabella Wright (born February 10, 1997) is an American World Cup alpine ski racer from Salt Lake City. She focuses on the speed events of downhill and super-G, and made her World Cup debut in December 2019 in a downhill at Lake Louise, Canada.

Wright represented the United States at the World Championships in 2021 at Cortina d'Ampezzo, Italy; just outside the top twenty in the downhill and super-G, she was fourteenth in the combined, won by teammate Mikaela Shiffrin.

She represented the United States at the 2022 Winter Olympics, and finished 21st in the super-G event.

World Cup results

Season standings

Top twenty finishes
*0 podiums, 2 top tens (2 DH)

World Championship results

Olympic results

References

External links

 
 Isabella Wright at U.S. Ski Team

1997 births
Living people
American female alpine skiers
Skiers from Salt Lake City
21st-century American women
People from American Fork, Utah
Alpine skiers at the 2022 Winter Olympics
Olympic alpine skiers of the United States